Great Oaks Career Campuses (formerly Great Oaks Institute of Technology and Career Development and Great Oaks Joint Vocational School District) is a joint vocational school district that has operated in parts of southwestern Ohio since 1970.

History
The Hamilton County Joint Vocational School District was formed in 1970 when 22 school districts came together as the Hamilton County Joint Vocational School District (Hamilton County JVSD). The name was changed to its current name two years later as school districts in Clermont County, Clinton County, and other areas in southwest Ohio joined.

Campuses
During their junior and senior years of high school, students from 36 Ohio school districts have the option to attend one of four Great Oaks campuses, known as Career Campuses:

 Diamond Oaks in western Cincinnati, covering the Finneytown, Mt. Healthy, North College Hill, Oak Hills, and Southwest, and Three Rivers school districts
 Laurel Oaks in Wilmington, covering the Blanchester, Clinton-Massie, East Clinton, Fairfield Local, Hillsboro, Lynchburg-Clay, Greenfield, Miami Trace, Washington Court House, and Wilmington school districts
 Live Oaks in Milford, covering the Batavia, Clermont Northeastern, Forest Hills, Goshen, Indian Hill, Loveland, Madeira, Mariemont, Milford, and West Clermont school districts
 Scarlet Oaks in Sharonville, covering the Deer Park, Lockland, Mason, Norwood, Princeton, Reading, St. Bernard–Elmwood Place, Sycamore, Winton Woods, and Wyoming school districts

Great Oaks also provides satellite programs to their affiliate schools.

References

External links
 

Educational institutions established in 1970
School districts in Ohio
Vocational education